Space Rocket Nation is a Danish film production company founded in 2008 by producer Lene Børglum and director Nicolas Winding Refn after their collaboration on Refn's film Valhalla Rising.

Productions
Nuka Eskimo Diva (2012) (documentary) by Lene Stæhr
Tabu (2012) (short fiction) by Bo Mikkelsen
Only God Forgives (2013) by Nicolas Winding Refn
My Life Directed by Nicolas Winding Refn (2014) (documentary) by Liv Corfixen
The Neon Demon (2016) by Nicolas Winding Refn
Too Old to Die Young (2019) by Nicolas Winding Refn and Ed Brubaker
Into the Darkness (2020) by Anders Refn

References

External links
 
 

Film production companies of Denmark
Mass media companies based in Copenhagen
Danish companies established in 2008
Companies based in Copenhagen Municipality